Jupiter was an ice hockey team in Kharkiv, Ukraine. The club replaced the dissolved Soviet hockey team Dynamo Kharkov that participated in the Soviet competitions. After the 1992–93 season Jupiter was also dissolved and later replaced with Salamandra Kharkiv.

They participated in the Ukrainian Hockey Championship during the 1992-93 season. Jupiter finished in second place in the first round and qualified for the final round, where they finished in third and last place.

References

External links
 Brief history
 Article commemorating the 20th Anniversary of the Ukrainian hockey

Ice hockey teams in Ukraine
Sport in Kharkiv